Sarawat Yai (lit: Chief Inspector) is a 2019 Thai action/crime  Television miniseries based on a 1989 popular Thai crime novel by Pol Gen Vasit Dejkunchorn and a remake of a 1994 miniseries of the same name. Written for television by Phukhao and directed by Pholchaya Metha, Sarawat Yai is produced by Dramagic Group, a Pasang Yasorn Company for Thai TV Ch. 7, and starring Kantapong Bumrungrak, Tussaneeya Karnsomnuch, Wathit Sopha, Ingfah Ketkham, Ornlene Sothiwanwongse, Nunthasai Pisalayabuth and Art Supawatt Purdy.  Sarawat Yai 2019 marks the first time Ch.7 ex-leading man Art Supawatt Purdy takes on the role of the villain, starring as the corrupted Pol Maj Gen Anek.

Sarawat Yai (translates roughly as "Big Inspector") or internationally titled The Law Enforcement is one of the few television miniseries that gives a true reflection of the modern Thai society with an emphasis on The Royal Thai Police Force.  The title is actually a play on words with double meaning, namely 'the big Inspector' and 'the Inspector named Yai'.  This 15-episode 2019 version of Sarawat Yai airs on Channel 7 HD every Friday during the 8:05pm, Saturday and Sunday during the 8:15pm time slot, with the first episode premiering on Sunday January 13, 2019.

Original version and controversy

The original version was produced by Kantana Group also for Thai TV Ch. 7 and directed by Nirattisai Kaljaruek, the now owner and managing director of Pasang Yasorn Co.,Ltd., and starring Likit Ekmongkol, Monrudee Yamaphai and  Yutthapichai "Dodo" Chanlekha.  Well received by viewers and critics, Sarawat Yai 1994 version unexpectedly received top viewership ratings.

Based on a true story of a real life Thai police and written by a policeman, Sarawat Yai gave a very vivid detailed account of real events that happened by exposing and bringing to light the problems of corruption in the Thai police force in a way that had never been done before. Naturally, the Thai Police viewed this expose as an insult and began to protest.  Soon the police initiated the campaign to ban the miniseries and demanded for channel 7 to stop broadcasting Sarawat Yai. Finally, after airing only half of its episodes, Ch. 7 suddenly took Sarawat Yai off the air, leaving the Thai television viewing audience puzzled as to how it ends. Many television miniseries enthusiasts wondered if the 2019 version will meet the same fate as its predecessor.  In an interview with MSN.com, the leading man Es Kantapong said that he was also worried that his version may be banned from broadcasting since the production wrapped almost two years ago, but Ch. 7 had not put it on its prime time line-up in 2018.  He added that he was quite relieved when he received news that Sarawat Yai 2019 version will go on air in January 2019.

Plot 

Yai Weroj, a young accomplished policeman is moved from the frontier to be the new chief inspector at Phra Lan Provincial Police Station, Phra Kamphaeng Province. Phra Lan is a remote area and full of illegal business and corruption in civil service circles. He tries to solve crimes and be a good role model for other policemen. He has Kampaeng, a beautiful wife who always supports him, as well as Pittayatorn, a greenhorn young policeman to assist him.

Cast
Kantapong Bumrungrak as Pol Maj Yai Weroj
Tussaneeya Karnsomnuch as Kampaeng
Wathit Sopha as Acting Pol Sub Lt Pittayatorn
Ingfah Ketkham as Mattanee
Ornlene Sothiwanwongse as Orathai
Art Supawatt Purdy as Pol Maj Gen Anek, Commander Anek
Nunthasai Pisalayabuth as Pol Col Sabanant
Nukkid Boonthong as Sergeant Booncherd
Surasak Chottinnawat as Pol Capt Kobkiat
Wasu Sangsingkaew as Governor Pichet
Praptpadol Suwanbang as Mogul Kakanand
Anuwat Niwatawong as Mogul Noi
Sumet Ong-art as Mogul Jaturon 
Pongsanart Vinsiri as Kamnan Chalongchok
Puchisa Thanapat as Nawakun
Worapot Chaem as Sergeant Pranote
Rahtree Wittawat as Sister Juab
Terdporn Manopaiboon as Soy milk old seller
Thanayong Wongtrakun as Sergeant Chart (cameo)

Reception 
Sarawat Yai 2019 debut episode received the viewership rating of 6.9, according to the Nielsen Rating (Thailand).  This number is considered to be high for prime time television miniseries.  After the debut episode, Sarawat Yai ratings continued to climb upwards reaching 8.4 by episode 9 on February 3, 2019.  According to TV Digital Watch website, the rating for the finale episode on February 17, 2019 peaked at 11.3, making 'Sarawat Yai' the first highest-rated primetime miniseries for Ch.7 this year.

Ratings 
In the tables below, the  represent the highest ratings and the  represent the lowest ratings.

Note: Sunday January 20, 2019, no broadcast due to live 2019 AFC Asian Cup between China vs Thailand from United Arab Emirates.

References

External links
 

Thai action television series
Thai television soap operas
2019 Thai television series debuts
2019 Thai television series endings
Channel 7 (Thailand) original programming